Metaparia is a genus of leaf beetles in the subfamily Eumolpinae. There are nine described species in Metaparia, from North America and Central America.

Species
These nine species belong to the genus Metaparia:
 Metaparia cephalotes (Lefèvre, 1877)
 Metaparia clytroides Crotch, 1873 i c g b
 Metaparia guatemalensis (Jacoby, 1881)
 Metaparia hybrida (Jacoby, 1881)
 Metaparia lesueuri (Lefèvre, 1875)
 Metaparia mandibuloflexa Sublett, Schultz, & Cook, 2021
 Metaparia opacicollis (Horn, 1892) i c g b 
 Metaparia prosopis Sublett, Schultz, & Cook, 2021
 Metaparia viridimicans (Horn, 1892) i c g b 

The following species have been moved to other genera:
 Metaparia distincta (Jacoby, 1881): moved to Brachypnoea
 Metaparia fulvicornis (Jacoby, 1890): moved to Spintherophyta, renamed to Spintherophyta jacobyi Sublett & Cook, 2021
 Metaparia laevicollis (Jacoby, 1881): moved to Dispardentium
 Metaparia thoracica (Jacoby, 1881): moved to Spintherophyta
 Metaparia violacea (Jacoby, 1890): moved to Spintherophyta

Data sources: i = ITIS, c = Catalogue of Life, g = GBIF, b = Bugguide.net

References

Further reading

 
 

Eumolpinae
Chrysomelidae genera
Articles created by Qbugbot
Beetles of North America
Beetles of Central America
Taxa named by George Robert Crotch